Signed into law June 28, 2005, and effective August 8, 2005, Louisiana State Act No 159 found in, Louisiana RS 40:989.1, outlawed the cultivation, possession or sale of 40 named plants defined as hallucinogenic in the state of Louisiana, US. House Bill 173 of 2010 further restricted the sale and possession of herbs in the state. However, use of the plants "strictly for aesthetic, landscaping, or decorative purposes" was allowed. The list contained as many as thirty legitimate herbs of commerce which had no hallucinogenic properties. The law was amended in 2015 to allow certain herbs that had been banned by the state to again be sold in dietary supplement products.

Plants
The following were declared to be "hallucinogenic plants" by the bill:

Amanita muscaria (a fungus, not a plant)
Anadenanthera colubrina
Anadenanthera peregrina
Atropa belladonna
Banisteriopsis spp.
Brugmansia arborea
Brunfelsia spp.
Calea zacatechichi
Conocybe spp. (a genus of fungi, not plants)
Datura spp.
Erythrina spp. (spelled Erythina in the bill)
Genista canariensis
Heimia salicifolia (spelled Heimia salicfolia in the bill)
Hyoscyamus niger
Ipomoea violacea
Kaempferia galanga
Lagochilus inebrians (spelled Lagoehilus inebrians in the bill)
Latua pubiflora (syn. Lycioplesium pubiflorum)
Mandragora officinarum
Mesembryanthemum spp.
Methysticodendron amesianum
Mimosa hostilis
Oldmedioperebea sclerophylla (spelled Olmedioperebea sclerophylla in the bill; syn. Maquira sclerophylla)
Panaeolus spp. (a genus of fungi, not plants)
Pancratium trianthum (spelled Pancreatium trianthum in the bill)
Peganum harmala
Physalis subglabrata
Prestonia amazonica (syn. Haemadictyon amazonicum)
Psilocybe spp. (a genus of fungi, not plants)
Rhynchosia spp.
Rivea corymbosa
Salvia divinorum
Solanum carolinense
Sophora secundiflora
Stropharia spp. (a genus of fungi, not plants)
Tabernanthe iboga
Tetrapteris methystica
Vinca rosea (syn. Catharanthus roseus)
Virola spp.

References

External links
Text of RS 40:989.1 Louisiana State Law Webpage
Text of HLS_05RS-52
 UNODC The plant kingdom and hallucinogens, Part I, II, III - This document appears to be the source of information the Louisiana legislators used regarding which species are hallucinogenic.

Drug control law in the United States
Entheogens
Lists of plants
United States law-related lists
159
2005 in American law
2005 in Louisiana